The Roman Catholic Diocese of Alindao is a diocese in Alindao in the Ecclesiastical province of Bangui in the Central African Republic.

History
December 18, 2004: Established as Diocese of Alindao from the Diocese of Bangassou

Special churches
The cathedral is the Cathédrale Sacré-Coeur in Alindao.

Bishops
Bishops of Alindao (Latin Church)
 Peter Marzinkowski, C.S.Sp. (December 18, 2004 – March 19, 2014)
 Cyr-Nestor Yapaupa (March 19, 2014–present)
Coadjutor bishop
 Cyr-Nestor Yapaupa (2012–2014)

See also
Roman Catholicism in the Central African Republic

External links
The website of the Diocese of Alindao
GCatholic.org

Alindao
Alindao
Christian organizations established in 2004
Roman Catholic dioceses and prelatures established in the 21st century
Basse-Kotto